Lauren Wildbolz (born March 17, 1981), is a Swiss Veganism expert, cook, entrepreneur and author of vegan cookbooks. The main topics of her work include i.a. vegan, organic and environmentally friendly food as well as animal welfare and the future of nutrition.

Early life and education 

Lauren Wildbolz was born to Swiss fashion photographer Jost Wildbolz and model Sandra Wildbolz on March 17, 1981, in Zürich, Switzerland. The first exposure to the topics later defining her career happened at age 14 when reading information about animal suffering, ledaing to adopting a vegetarian diet.
 
Wildbolz passed her entrance exam at the F+F School for Art and Media Design Zurich, but soon after decided to follow her passion for diving and worked as a diving instructor abroad, where she trained as a technical diver herself. She also worked as a vegetarian cook on a ship. Upon her return to Switzerland, she graduated with a bachelor's degree in fine art from the Zurich University of the Arts in 2013. Within the framework of the project Good Food For You For Free and as part of her bachelor thesis, she combined food and art by cooking vegan multi-course meals prepared with ingredients gathered by dumpster diving, free of charge and addressing the issue of food waste. She continued her academic training at the ZHdK, earning master's degrees in transdisciplinarity and in fine arts, completing her studies in 2015 with the project Dreckskekse (dirt cookies), baking cookies with i.a. composted earth. Besides, she examined overproduction of food, immoderation, famine and the question of an economic solution in her master thesis. At the age of 27, she decided to adopt a vegan lifestyle.

Career 
While studying at university, she came up with the idea to cook and promote vegan food in her restaurant "Vegan Kitchen and Bakery". Opening its doors in 2010, it was the first vegan restaurant in Switzerland. She later sold the restaurant to Soyana, a Swiss company selling organic vegan food. Between 2015 and 2018, she worked with the Klubschule Migros to realize a vegan cooking course. 
 
During the COVID-19 lockdowns, Wildbolz was involved in revamping the concept of the Zürich restaurant Maison Blunt, re-branding it to Maison Raison with a vegan menu and organic supplies. Furthermore, she coached the kitchen team and initially worked herself as head chef. The restaurant was sold to Zineb Hattab in September 2021 and is now operating under the name Dar.
 
Within the scope of her entrepreneurial activities, she runs a catering business called Future Cuisine, gives cooking classes and works as a consultant and keynote speaker for plant-based nutrition. Furthermore, she has founded the startup company PLANTBOX, a cooking box that aims to familiarise people with plant-based cooking and nutrition at home. In 2021, her vegan cake dessert range KUBO was launched, a frozen dessert range developed for restaurant businesses. As of April 2022, Wildbolz has released two vegan cookbooks, contributed to others and is working on her next publication about the future of nutrition. Additionally, she works as an expert and teacher at the Neuro Culinary Center in Vitznau and as Creative director for Soil to Soul.
 
Wildbolz's key topics revolve around the question of feeding the growing global population sensibly and sustainably, and the future of food. She has been featured in various media appearances. She works as an advisor to companies and helps them adopting a sustainable approach. Lauren Wildbolz resides in Zürich.

Publications

Own works 
2017: Vegan Love (in German), AT Verlag, Aarau, ISBN 978-3038009214
2014: Vegan kitchen and friends, l'Age d'Homme, Lausanne, ISBN 978-2825143643

Contributions (selection) 
2016: Sophia Hoffmann: Vegan Queens (in German), p. 134-155, Edel Books, Hamburg, ISBN 978-3841904782

References

External links 
Official website
 

 
1981 births
Living people
Swiss writers in German
Vegan cookbook writers
Veganism activists
Swiss artists